The Altmühl Valley Nature Park is a nature park, 2,962 km² in area, in the south German state of Bavaria. The area of the park is almost coextensive with that of the natural region major unit of the Southern Franconian Jura (Südliche Frankenalb). It lies immediately north of the city of Ingolstadt on the River Danube and is divided into a southern and northern Altmühl Valley.

Description 
The nature park was established on 25 July 1969 in Pappenheim by society formed for the purpose, the Naturpark Altmühltal (Südliche Frankenalb) ("Altmühl Valley Nature Park (Southern Franconian Jura)"). It is the fourth largest nature park in Germany after the Central/North Black Forest Nature Park, Bergstraße-Odenwald Nature Park and Southern Black Forest Nature Park.

See also 
 List of nature parks in Germany

References

Literature 
 Das Tal der Uraltmühl, 144 Seiten, Tümmels, Nuremberg, 
 Das Urdonautal der Altmühl, 132 Seiten, Tümmels, Nuremberg,

External links 

 Altmühl Valley Nature Park, at naturpark-altmuehltal.de

Nature parks in Bavaria
Eichstätt (district)
Kelheim (district)
Weißenburg-Gunzenhausen
Franconia